The Town of Merino is a Statutory Town in Logan County, Colorado, United States.  The town population was 284 at the 2010 United States Census.

The town was named for the merino sheep which grazed there.

Geography
Merino is located at  (40.484418, -103.353691).

Demographics

As of the census of 2000, there were 246 people, 96 households, and 66 families residing in the town. The racial makeup of the town was 93.90% White, 0.81% Native American, 4.07% from other races, and 1.22% from two or more races. Hispanic or Latino of any race were 6.91% of the population.

There were 96 households, out of which 41.7% had children under the age of 18 living with them, 54.2% were married couples living together, 9.4% had a female householder with no husband present, and 31.3% were non-families. 27.1% of all households were made up of individuals, and 14.6% had someone living alone who was 65 years of age or older. The average household size was 2.56 and the average family size was 3.15.

In the town, the population was spread out, with 30.9% under the age of 18, 6.5% from 18 to 24, 25.2% from 25 to 44, 24.4% from 45 to 64, and 13.0% who were 65 years of age or older. The median age was 38 years. For every 100 females, there were 90.7 males. For every 100 females age 18 and over, there were 80.9 males.

The median income for a household in the town was $28,750, and the median income for a family was $31,406. Males had a median income of $26,250 versus $22,000 for females. The per capita income for the town was $14,943. About 7.6% of families and 9.9% of the population were below the poverty line, including 13.3% of those under the age of eighteen and 18.0% of those 65 or over.

Climate
According to the Köppen Climate Classification system, Merino has a semi-arid climate, abbreviated "BSk" on climate maps.

Notable People 
Radio and television host Ralph Edwards was born in Merino. Ralph Edwards Avenue was named in his memory.

See also

Outline of Colorado
Index of Colorado-related articles
State of Colorado
Colorado cities and towns
Colorado municipalities
Colorado counties
Logan County, Colorado
List of statistical areas in Colorado
Sterling, CO Micropolitan Statistical Area
Ralph Edwards

References

External links
Town of Merino contacts
CDOT map of the Town of Merino

Towns in Logan County, Colorado
Towns in Colorado